John Michel (1804–1886) was a British Army officer.

John Michel may also refer to:
John B. Michel, (1917–1969),  science fiction author, member of the Futurians
John Michel (television), director of at least two episodes of the TV series Scrubs
John Michel (1660-1739), MP for Sandwich between 1698 and 1713
John Michel (Belfast MP) (1765–1844), British Army general and MP for Belfast 1816–18

See also
John Michell (disambiguation)
John Mitchell (disambiguation)